Walnut Township, Ohio may refer to:

Walnut Township, Fairfield County, Ohio
Walnut Township, Gallia County, Ohio
Walnut Township, Pickaway County, Ohio

See also
Walnut Township (disambiguation)

Ohio township disambiguation pages